Metatropis is a genus of true bugs belonging to the family Berytidae.

The species of this genus are found in Europe and Japan.

Species:
 Metatropis aurita Breddin, 1907 
 Metatropis brevirostris Hsiao, 1974

References

Berytidae